G. S. Vijayan is an Indian film director who primarily works in Malayalam. He had his debut with the Mammootty-starrer Charithram. His other films include Aanaval Mothiram and Ghoshayathra.

Vijayan's had started filming an uncompleted project titled Chodhyam which had Mohanlal and Rahman . It was the remake of Tamil hit Puriyaadha Pudhir. Mohanlal' s role was played by Sarathkumar in the Tamil version. After completing the Suresh Gopi-starrer Cover Story in 2000, Vijayan did not direct a film for 12 years. He made a comeback in 2012 with Bavuttiyude Namathil starring Mammootty. The film was written and produced by Ranjith.

Filmography

External links 
 

Living people
Year of birth missing (living people)
Malayalam screenwriters
Malayalam film directors
20th-century Indian film directors
21st-century Indian film directors